90502 may refer to:
 90502 Buratti, minor planet
 The ZIP Code for West Carson, California